Neerja Modi School  is a private co-educational K-12 day cum boarding school in Jaipur, Rajasthan, India. The school has been built by Shri Modi Shikshan Sansthan and has  campuses spread across Rajasthan.

Neerja Modi School represents students from various countries & from all over India. The school hosts inter-school tournaments & teams participate at the district, state & national levels in chess, squash, lawn tennis, badminton, athletics, basketball, football, archery, cricket, swimming, and table tennis. NMS has a strength of 5200+ students and 500+ faculty members.

Accreditation 

Neerja Modi School was established in 2001 and follows the CBSE curriculum. NMS was recognized and authorized by the International Baccalaureate of Geneva in 2012 and offers the IB Program in its Diploma format.

Saurabh Modi is the chairperson of the school. The school is affiliated to the CISCE which conducts its ICSE examinations for Class 10 and ISC examinations for Classes 11 and 12 and the IB, which conducts its IBDP examinations for Classes 11 and 12.

Academics & System of Education

Primary School - Nursery to Class 5 

The Primary School programme comprises Nursery, Lower and Upper Kindergarten (LKG and UKG) years and classes from Standard I to V. In classes Nursery to V, the school teaches a comprehensive curriculum by drawing on teaching programmes of CBSE. The International wing of the school offers the Cambridge International Primary Programme from classes 1 to 5.

Middle School - Classes 6 to 8 

The Middle School Programme i.e. classes VI to VIII follow the NCERT curriculum. The international wing follows the Cambridge Lower Secondary Programme for classes 6-8.

Secondary School - Classes 9 & 10 

The school offers the All India Secondary School Examination of CBSE and IGCSE Programme for classes IX and X.

Post-Secondary School - Classes 11 & 12 

NMS offers the All India Senior Secondary Certificate Examination of CBSE and the IB Diploma Programme for students of classes XI and XII.

Facilities 

Spread across 20 acres, with expansive green grounds, the school comprises state-of-the-art classrooms, laboratories, landscaped gardens and playgrounds. There are laboratories for Physics, Chemistry, Biology and Computer Science. There are also exclusive activity rooms for Art, Instrumental Music, Vocal Music and Dance. The school houses tennis courts, badminton court, a 400m athletic track, basketball courts, a football field, an archery range, an international standard cricket ground and nets, in addition to a 25-meter lap swimming pool and a table tennis hall.

Every classroom is equipped with display and writing white boards, a public address system, broadband Internet access and air conditioning with student lockers in the corridors. There is school-wide Wi-Fi internet access only for the students of grades 9-12 affiliated with the IGCSE and IB.

The school has multiple Learning Centres with access to reading and audio-visual resources, internet and photocopying/printing facilities.

Moving Online

When all educational institutions were shut by the Government of India in March 2020 induced by the global COVID-19 pandemic, Neerja Modi School transitioned to virtual instructions through synchronous learning for all academic and co-curricular activities.

Student Opportunities

NMS offers wide-ranging opportunities to students to engage in meaningful co-curricular and leadership experiences. There are 30+ activity clubs and student-led organisations in the school and student participation in the diverse range of clubs such as the Art Appreciation Club, Bio Sciences Club, Chemistry Club, Psychology Club and much more is reflective of the diversity and initiative within the community.

During the pandemic, many of the school’s activities had taken place virtually, including Jaipur Debate, Model United Nations, Research Programmes, Literature Festival, Summer Camps, Annual Club Fair, Community Service projects (Music Concert Fundraiser, and work with local NGOs), Leadership programmes like TEDxYouth@NMS, Student Council and more.

Awards & Recognition 

 Ranked No. 1 educational institute in Jaipur, Rajasthan
 Achieved 7th position pan India in annual Education World India School Rankings for 2021-22
 Honoured with prestigious Education World School of Eminence Award 2021-22 for students' holistic & integrated development

NMS Campuses

 Shipra Path, Mansarovar
 SEZ Road, Kalwara
 Vaishali Nagar Pre School

See also 
 List of Schools in Rajasthan

References

External links
Official website
International Baccalaureate
IGCSE affiliation

Boarding schools in Rajasthan
Private schools in Rajasthan
Schools in Jaipur
2001 establishments in Rajasthan
Educational institutions established in 2001